Munida acantha is a species of squat lobster in the family Munididae. The species name is derived from the Greek acantha, meaning "spine", referring to the long distomesial spine on the base antennal segment.

References

Squat lobsters
Crustaceans described in 1994